Steve Berry (born September 2, 1955) is an American author and former attorney currently living in St. Augustine, Florida. He is a graduate of Mercer University's Walter F. George School of Law.  He was a trial lawyer for 30 years and held elected office for 14 of those years. He is a founding member of International Thriller Writers—a group of more than 4,200 thriller writers from around the world—and served three years as its co-president.

Work
Berry first appeared in print with his historical thrillers The Amber Room and The Romanov Prophecy in 2003 and 2004. A practicing attorney at the time, Berry had been writing fiction since 1990, and it took him 12 years and 85 rejections before selling a manuscript to Ballantine Books. Berry credits the nuns who taught him in Catholic school with instilling the discipline needed both to craft a novel and to find a publisher.

Berry's novels have been listed on The New York Times, USA Today, Publishers Weekly, and BookSense bestseller lists. He has more than 25 million books in print, which have been translated into 40 languages and sold in 51 countries.

Berry resides in the northeast Florida area.

Awards
In 2012 and 2013, Berry's historic preservation work was recognized by the American Library Association, which named him spokesperson for National Preservation Week. Among his other honors is the Royden B. Davis Distinguished Author Award; the 2013 Barnes & Noble Writers for Writers Award given by Poets & Writers; the 2013 Anne Frank Human Writes Award; and the Silver Bullet, bestowed in 2013 by International Thriller Writers for philanthropic work. He was also appointed by the Smithsonian Board of Regents to serve on the Smithsonian Libraries Advisory Board to help promote and support libraries in their mission to provide information in all forms to scientists, curators, scholars, students, and the public. A 2010 NPR survey named The Templar Legacy one of the top 100 thrillers ever written.

Bibliography

Standalone novels

Cassiopeia Vitt Adventures
(with M. J. Rose)

Cotton Malone novels
These novels star Cotton Malone, a bookseller and former and freelance spy for the fictitious covert US intelligence agency Magellan Billet.

Berry has released four short stories in eBook-only form featuring side characters from the Cotton Malone novels. These stories act somewhat as prequels to The Emperor's Tomb, The Jefferson Key, The Columbus Affair, and The King's Deception, respectively. The first three are available in Three Tales from the World of Cotton Malone: The Balkan Escape, The Devil's Gold, and The Admiral's Mark (Short Stories).  Each short story is also included in the paperback edition of the book it precedes.

Anthologies and collections 

Edited by Steve Berry

Introductions by Steve Berry

Illustrated By Steve Berry

References

External links

History Matters, the Steve and Elizabeth Berry foundation to preserve historical sites
Biography at Bookreporter.com
Modern Signed Books BlogTalkRadio Interview with Rodger Nichols about The 14th Colony May 2016

1955 births
Living people
Novelists from Georgia (U.S. state)
People from St. Augustine, Florida
21st-century American novelists
People from Camden County, Georgia
American male novelists
American male short story writers
21st-century American short story writers
21st-century American male writers